Konidena is a small village in Ballikurava mandal and Prakasam district of the state of Andhra Pradesh, India.

Between the 7th and 13th centuries, it was a regional capital of Telugu Cholas.

References

Villages in Prakasam district